Island Pond is a  pond in the Cedarville section of Plymouth, Massachusetts, one of three ponds named Island Pond within the town (one is located near South Pond village, and the other is located in The Pinehills development, better known as Great Island Pond). The pond is located northwest of Great Herring Pond, north of Elbow Pond, southwest of Little Herring Pond, and south of Triangle Pond.

References

External links
Environmental Protection Agency
South Shore Coastal Watersheds - Lake Assessments

Ponds of Plymouth, Massachusetts
Ponds of Massachusetts